The 2011–12 Toronto Maple Leafs season was the 95th season for the National Hockey League (NHL) franchise that was established on November 22, 1917. The team failed to make the Stanley Cup playoffs for the seventh-straight season.

Off-season

At the 2011 NHL Entry Draft, general manager Brian Burke fulfilled his pledge to trade up in the first round, trading the 30th (Rickard Rakell) and 39th (John Gibson) picks to the Anaheim Ducks in exchange for the 22nd pick, which was used to select Tyler Biggs. The Leafs also selected Stuart Percy with the 25th pick.

The Leafs made two key free agent additions, adding centers Tim Connolly from the Buffalo Sabres and Philippe Dupuis from the Colorado Avalanche. The Leafs also added to their blue line by trading Brett Lebda and prospect Robert Slaney to the Nashville Predators in exchange for Cody Franson and center Matthew Lombardi.

The Leafs suffered no major losses during the off-season, however Tim Brent, who had an impressive season with the Leafs, was signed by the Carolina Hurricanes and veteran goalie Jean-Sebastien Giguere was acquired by the Colorado Avalanche. Other Leafs to depart the team included Danny Richmond (to the Washington Capitals), Christian Hanson, (to Washington) and Fabian Brunnstrom (to the Detroit Red Wings).

On October 4, the Leafs traded their fourth round pick at the 2012 NHL Entry Draft to the New Jersey Devils in exchange for centre Dave Steckel.

Prior to the beginning of the regular season, the Leafs unveiled new alternate jerseys, similar to the ones they used when they last won the Stanley Cup in 1967.

Pre-season
The Maple Leafs went 4–4 in pre-season play.

Regular season
The Maple Leafs got off to a fast start, winning their first three games and seven of their first ten, finishing October in first place in the Northeast Division, second in the Conference. Phil Kessel was the NHL's leading points scorer with 18, and leading goal scorer with 10. James Reimer was the starting goaltender for the first five games, but was injured in his next start when the Montreal Canadiens' Brian Gionta struck Reimer in the jaw while fighting for the puck. Early in the season, the Leafs' power play has dramatically improved, with a 21.6% conversion rate, good for third in the league as of December 17, 2011. However, when short-handed, they had been less efficient, with a 73.0% kill rate, the worst in the NHL.

On February 9, 2012, the NHL announced that the Leafs would play the Detroit Red Wings at Michigan Stadium for the 2013 NHL Winter Classic on January 1, 2013. It would later be postponed to 2014 due to the lockout.

With the Leafs falling out of the playoff race and in the midst of losing 10 of their last 11 games, including a six-game losing streak, head coach Ron Wilson was fired and replaced by Randy Carlyle on March 2, 2012. The Leafs went 6–9–3 under Carlyle to end the season.

Playoffs
The Maple Leafs attempted to finally qualify for the Stanley Cup playoffs for the first time since the 2003–04 season. The Hockey News predicted that the Leafs will place tenth and miss the playoffs. The Maple Leafs were ultimately eliminated from playoff contention.

Standings

Schedule and results

Pre-season

|- style="text-align:center; background:#cfc;"
| 1 || September 19 || Ottawa Senators || 2–4 || Toronto Maple Leafs || ||Jonas Gustavsson ||1–0–0
|- style="text-align:center; background:#fbb;"
| 2 || September 20 || Philadelphia Flyers || 4–0 || Toronto Maple Leafs || ||James Reimer ||1–1–0
|- style="text-align:center; background:#cfc;"
| 3 || September 21 || Toronto Maple Leafs || 4–2 || Philadelphia Flyers || ||Jonas Gustavsson ||2–1–0
|- style="text-align:center; background:#fbb;"
| 4 || September 23 || Buffalo Sabres || 2–1 || Toronto Maple Leafs || || James Reimer ||2–2–0
|- style="text-align:center; background:#fbb;"
| 5 || September 24 || Toronto Maple Leafs || 2–3 || Buffalo Sabres || || Jonas Gustavsson || 2–3–0
|- style="text-align:center; background:#cfc;"
| 6 || September 27 || Toronto Maple Leafs || 5–3 || Ottawa Senators || || James Reimer || 3–3–0
|- style="text-align:center; background:#cfc;"
| 7 || September 30 || Toronto Maple Leafs || 4–3 || Detroit Red Wings || OT || Jonas Gustavsson || 4–3–0
|- style="text-align:center; background:#fbb;"
| 8 || October 1 || Detroit Red Wings || 4–2 || Toronto Maple Leafs || || James Reimer || 4–4–0
|-

Regular season

|- style="text-align:center; background:#cfc;"
| 1 || 6 || Montreal Canadiens || 2–0 || Air Canada Centre (19,606) || 1–0–0 || 2 || Reimer
|- style="text-align:center; background:#cfc;"
| 2 || 8 || Ottawa Senators || 6–5 || Air Canada Centre (19,324) || 2–0–0 || 4 || Reimer
|- style="text-align:center; background:#cfc;"
| 3 || 15 || Calgary Flames || 3–2 || Air Canada Centre (19,410) || 3–0–0 || 6 || Reimer
|- style="text-align:center; background:#ffc;"
| 4 || 17 || Colorado Avalanche || 2–3 (OT) || Air Canada Centre (19,359) || 3–0–1 || 7 || Reimer
|- style="text-align:center; background:#cfc;"
| 5 || 19 || Winnipeg Jets || 4–3 (SO) || Air Canada Centre (19,514) || 4–0–1 || 9 || Reimer
|- style="text-align:center; background:#fcc;"
| 6 || 20 || @ Boston Bruins || 2–6 || TD Garden (17,565) || 4–1–1 || 9 || Gustavsson
|- style="text-align:center; background:#cfc;"
| 7 || 22 || @ Montreal Canadiens || 5–4 (OT) || Bell Centre (21,273) || 5–1–1 || 11 || Gustavsson
|- style="text-align:center; background:#fcc;"
| 8 || 24 || @ Philadelphia Flyers || 2–4 || Wells Fargo Center (19,569) || 5–2–1 || 11 || Gustavsson
|- style="text-align:center; background:#cfc;"
| 9 || 27 || @ New York Rangers || 4–2 || Madison Square Garden (18,200) || 6–2–1 || 13 || Gustavsson
|- style="text-align:center; background:#cfc;"
| 10 || 29 || Pittsburgh Penguins || 4–3 || Air Canada Centre (19,526) || 7–2–1 || 15 || Gustavsson
|- style="text-align:center; background:#fcc;"
| 11 || 30 || @ Ottawa Senators || 2–3 || Scotiabank Place (19,522) || 7–3–1 || 15 || Gustavsson
|-

|- style="text-align:center; background:#cfc;"
| 12 || 2 || @ New Jersey Devils || 5–3 || Prudential Center (13,033) || 8–3–1 || 17 || Gustavsson
|- style="text-align:center; background:#cfc;"
| 13 || 3 || @ Columbus Blue Jackets || 4–1 || Nationwide Arena (14,306) || 9–3–1 || 19 || Scrivens
|- style="text-align:center; background:#fcc;"
| 14 || 5 || Boston Bruins || 0–7 || Air Canada Centre (19,497) || 9–4–1 || 19 || Scrivens
|- style="text-align:center; background:#fcc;"
| 15 || 8 || Florida Panthers || 1–5 || Air Canada Centre (19,414) || 9–5–1 || 19 || Gustavsson
|- style="text-align:center; background:#cfc;"
| 16 || 10 || @ St. Louis Blues || 3–2 (SO) || Scottrade Center (19,150) || 10–5–1 || 21 || Scrivens
|- style="text-align:center; background:#fcc;"
| 17 || 12 || Ottawa Senators || 2–5 || Air Canada Centre (19,553) || 10–6–1 || 21 || Scrivens
|- style="text-align:center; background:#ffc;"
| 18 || 15 || Phoenix Coyotes || 2–3 (SO) || Air Canada Centre (19,522) || 10–6–2 || 22 || Scrivens
|- style="text-align:center; background:#fcc;"
| 19 || 17 || @ Nashville Predators || 1–4 || Bridgestone Arena (16,135) || 10–7–2 || 22 || Scrivens
|- style="text-align:center; background:#cfc;"
| 20 || 19 || Washington Capitals || 7–1 || Air Canada Centre (19,594) || 11–7–2 || 24 || Gustavsson
|- style="text-align:center; background:#fcc;"
| 21 || 20 || @ Carolina Hurricanes || 2–3 || RBC Center (13,187) || 11–8–2 || 24 || Scrivens
|- style="text-align:center; background:#cfc;"
| 22 || 22 || @ Tampa Bay Lightning || 7–1 || St. Pete Times Forum (19,204) || 12–8–2 || 26 || Gustavsson
|- style="text-align:center; background:#cfc;"
| 23 || 25 || @ Dallas Stars || 4–3 (SO) || American Airlines Center (18,532) || 13–8–2 || 28 || Gustavsson
|- style="text-align:center; background:#cfc;"
| 24 || 27 || @ Anaheim Ducks || 5–2 || Honda Center (13,685) || 14–8–2 || 30 || Gustavsson
|- style="text-align:center; background:#fcc;"
| 25 || 30 || Boston Bruins || 3–6 || Air Canada Centre (19,643) || 14–9–2 || 30 || Gustavsson
|-

|- style="text-align:center; background:#fcc;"
| 26 || 3 || @ Boston Bruins || 1–4 || TD Garden (17,565) || 14–10–2 || 30 || Reimer
|- style="text-align:center; background:#cfc;"
| 27 || 5 || @ New York Rangers || 4–2 || Madison Square Garden (18,200) || 15–10–2 || 32 || Gustavsson
|- style="text-align:center; background:#ffc;"
| 28 || 6 || New Jersey Devils || 2–3 (OT) || Air Canada Centre (19,513) || 15–10–3 || 33 || Reimer
|- style="text-align:center; background:#fcc;"
| 29 || 9 || @ Washington Capitals || 2–4 || Verizon Center (18,506) || 15–11–3 || 33 || Reimer
|- style="text-align:center; background:#cfc;"
| 30 || 13 || Carolina Hurricanes || 2–1 (OT) || Air Canada Centre (19,509) || 16–11–3 || 35 || Reimer
|- style="text-align:center; background:#fcc;"
| 31 || 16 || @ Buffalo Sabres || 4–5 || First Niagara Center (18,690) || 16–12–3 || 35 || Reimer
|- style="text-align:center; background:#fcc;"
| 32 || 17 || Vancouver Canucks || 3–5 || Air Canada Centre (19,633) || 16–13–3 || 35 || Gustavsson
|- style="text-align:center; background:#ffc;"
| 33 || 19 || Los Angeles Kings || 2–3 (SO) || Air Canada Centre (19,521) || 16–13–4 || 36 || Reimer
|- style="text-align:center; background:#cfc;"
| 34 || 22 || Buffalo Sabres || 3–2 || Air Canada Centre (19,473) || 17–13–4 || 38 || Reimer
|- style="text-align:center; background:#cfc;"
| 35 || 23 || @ New York Islanders || 5–3 || Nassau Veterans Memorial Coliseum (12,432) || 18–13–4 || 40 || Reimer
|- style="text-align:center; background:#fcc;"
| 36 || 27 || @ Florida Panthers || 3–5 || BankAtlantic Center (20,406) || 18–14–4 || 40 || Gustavsson
|- style="text-align:center; background:#ffc;"
| 37 || 29 || @ Carolina Hurricanes || 3–4 (OT) || RBC Center (17,461) || 18–14–5 || 41 || Reimer
|- style="text-align:center; background:#fcc;"
| 38 || 31 || @ Winnipeg Jets || 2–3 || MTS Centre (15,004) || 18–15–5 || 41 || Reimer
|-

|- style="text-align:center; background:#cfc;"
| 39 || 3 || Tampa Bay Lightning || 7–3 || Air Canada Centre (19,425) || 19–15–5 || 43 || Gustavsson
|- style="text-align:center; background:#cfc;"
| 40 || 5 || Winnipeg Jets || 4–0 || Air Canada Centre (19,514) || 20–15–5 || 45 || Gustavsson
|- style="text-align:center; background:#cfc;"
| 41 || 7 || Detroit Red Wings || 4–3 || Air Canada Centre (19,536) || 21–15–5 || 47 || Gustavsson
|- style="text-align:center; background:#cfc;"
| 42 || 10 || Buffalo Sabres || 2–0 || Air Canada Centre (19,431) || 22–15–5 || 49 || Gustavsson
|- style="text-align:center; background:#fcc;"
| 43 || 13 || @ Buffalo Sabres || 2–3 || First Niagara Center (18,690) || 22–16–5 || 49 || Gustavsson
|- style="text-align:center; background:#fcc;"
| 44 || 14 || New York Rangers || 0–3 || Air Canada Centre (19,617) || 22–17–5 || 49 || Gustavsson
|- style="text-align:center; background:#fcc;"
| 45 || 17 || Ottawa Senators || 2–3 || Air Canada Centre (19,615) || 22–18–5 || 49 || Reimer
|- style="text-align:center; background:#cfc;"
| 46 || 19 || Minnesota Wild || 4–1 || Air Canada Centre (19,421) || 23–18–5 || 51 || Gustavsson
|- style="text-align:center; background:#fcc;"
| 47 || 21 || Montreal Canadiens || 1–3 || Air Canada Centre (19,643) || 23–19–5 || 51 || Gustavsson
|- style="text-align:center; background:#cfc;"
| 48 || 23 || New York Islanders || 3–0 || Air Canada Centre (19,570) || 24–19–5 || 53 || Gustavsson
|- style="text-align:center; background:#cfc;"
| 49 || 24 || @ New York Islanders || 4–3 (OT)|| Nassau Veterans Memorial Coliseum (10,888) || 25–19–5 || 55 || Gustavsson
|- style="text-align:center; background:#ffc;"
| 50 || 31 || @ Pittsburgh Penguins || 4–5 (SO) || Consol Energy Center (18,550) || 25–19–6 || 56 || Gustavsson
|-

|- style="text-align:center; background:#cfc;"
| 51 || 1 || Pittsburgh Penguins || 1–0 || Air Canada Centre (19,542) || 26–19–6 || 58 || Reimer
|- style="text-align:center; background:#cfc;"
| 52 || 4 || @ Ottawa Senators || 5–0 || Scotiabank Place (20,500) || 27–19–6 || 60 || Reimer
|- style="text-align:center; background:#cfc;"
| 53 || 6 || Edmonton Oilers || 6–3 || Air Canada Centre (19,581) || 28–19–6 || 62 || Reimer
|- style="text-align:center; background:#fcc;"
| 54 || 7 || @ Winnipeg Jets || 1–2 || MTS Centre (15,004) || 28–20–6 || 62 || Gustavsson
|- style="text-align:centre; background:#fcc;"
| 55 || 9 || @ Philadelphia Flyers || 3–4 || Wells Fargo Center (19,684) || 28–21–6 || 62 || Reimer
|- style="text-align:centre; background:#fcc;"
| 56 || 11 || Montreal Canadiens || 0–5 || Air Canada Centre (19,685) || 28–22–6 || 62 || Reimer
|- style="text-align:center; background:#fcc;"
| 57 || 14 || @ Calgary Flames || 1–5 || Scotiabank Saddledome (19,289) || 28–23–6 || 62 || Gustavsson
|- style="text-align:center; background:#cfc;"
| 58 || 15 || @ Edmonton Oilers || 4–3 (OT) || Rexall Place (16,839) || 29–23–6 || 64 || Reimer
|- style="text-align:center; background:#fcc;"
| 59 || 18 || @ Vancouver Canucks || 2–6 || Rogers Arena (18,890) || 29–24–6 || 64 || Reimer
|- style="text-align:center; background:#ffc;"
| 60 || 21 || New Jersey Devils || 3–4 (OT) || Air Canada Centre (19,426) || 29–24–7 || 65 || Gustavsson
|- style="text-align:center; background:#fcc;"
| 61 || 23 || San Jose Sharks || 1–2 || Air Canada Centre (19,493) || 29–25–7 || 65 || Reimer
|- style="text-align:center; background:#fcc;"
| 62 || 25 || Washington Capitals || 2–4 || Air Canada Centre (19,577) || 29–26–7 || 65 || Reimer
|- style="text-align:center; background:#fcc;"
| 63 || 28 || Florida Panthers || 3–5 || Air Canada Centre (19,420) || 29–27–7 || 65 || Reimer
|- style="text-align:center; background:#fcc;"
| 64 || 29 || @ Chicago Blackhawks || 4–5 || United Center (21,244) || 29–28–7 || 65 || Gustavsson
|-

|- style="text-align:center; background:#cfc;"
| 65 || 3 || @ Montreal Canadiens || 3–1 || Bell Centre (21,273) || 30–28–7 || 67 || Gustavsson
|- style="text-align:center; background:#fcc;"
| 66 || 6 || Boston Bruins || 4–5 || Air Canada Centre (19,684) || 30–29–7 || 67 || Gustavsson
|- style="text-align:center; background:#fcc;"
| 67 || 7 || @ Pittsburgh Penguins || 2–3 || Consol Energy Center (18,539) || 30–30–7 || 67 || Gustavsson
|- style="text-align:center; background:#ffc;"
| 68 || 10 || Philadelphia Flyers || 0–1 (SO) || Air Canada Centre (19,559) || 30–30–8 || 68 || Gustavsson
|- style="text-align:center; background:#fcc;"
| 69 || 11 || @ Washington Capitals || 0–2 || Verizon Center (18,506) || 30–31–8 || 68 || Gustavsson
|- style="text-align:center; background:#fcc;"
| 70 || 13 || @ Florida Panthers || 2–5 || BankAtlantic Center (17,475) || 30–32–8 || 68 || Reimer
|- style="text-align:center; background:#cfc;"
| 71 || 15 || @ Tampa Bay Lightning || 3–1 || Tampa Bay Times Forum (19,204) || 31–32–8 || 70 || Reimer
|- style="text-align:center; background:#cfc;"
| 72 || 17 || @ Ottawa Senators || 3–1 || Scotiabank Place (20,500) || 32–32–8 || 72 || Reimer
|- style="text-align:center; background:#fcc;"
| 73 || 19 || @ Boston Bruins || 0–8 || TD Garden (17,565) || 32–33–8 || 72 || Reimer
|- style="text-align:center; background:#fcc;"
| 74 || 20 || New York Islanders || 2–5 || Air Canada Centre (19,351) || 32–34–8 || 72 || Reimer
|- style="text-align:center; background:#cfc;"
| 75 || 23 || @ New Jersey Devils || 4–3 (SO) || Prudential Center (16,022) || 33–34–8 || 74 || Reimer
|- style="text-align:center; background:#ffc;"
| 76 || 24 || New York Rangers || 3–4 (SO) || Air Canada Centre (19,507) || 33–34–9 || 75 || Gustavsson
|- style="text-align:center; background:#fcc;"
| 77 || 27 || Carolina Hurricanes || 0–3 || Air Canada Centre (19,348) || 33–35–9 || 75 || Gustavsson
|- style="text-align:center; background:#fcc;"
| 78 || 29 || Philadelphia Flyers || 1–7 || Air Canada Centre (19,415) || 33–36–9 || 75 || Rynnas
|- style="text-align:center; background:#cfc;"
| 79 || 31 || Buffalo Sabres || 4–3 || Air Canada Centre (19,446) || 34–36–9 || 77 || Scrivens
|-

|- style="text-align:center; background:#ffc;"
| 80 || 3 || @ Buffalo Sabres || 5–6 (OT) || First Niagara Center (18,690) || 34–36–10 || 78 || Scrivens
|- style="text-align:center; background:#cfc;"
| 81 || 5 || Tampa Bay Lightning || 3–2 (OT) || Air Canada Centre (19,369) || 35–36–10 || 80 || Scrivens
|- style="text-align:center; background:#fcc;"
| 82 || 7 || @ Montreal Canadiens || 1–4 || Bell Centre (21,273) || 35–37–10 || 80 || Scrivens
|-

Overtime statistics

Player statistics
Final stats

Skaters

Goaltenders

†Denotes player spent time with another team before joining Maple Leafs. Stats reflect time with Maple Leafs only.
‡Traded mid-season.
Bold/italics denotes franchise record.

Awards and records

Awards

Records

Milestones

Transactions
The Maple Leafs have been involved in the following transactions during the 2011–12 season.

Trades

Free agents acquired

Free agents lost

Claimed via waivers

Lost via waivers

Lost via retirement

Player signings

Draft picks
Toronto's picks at the 2011 NHL Entry Draft in St. Paul, Minnesota.

See also
 2011–12 NHL season

References

Toronto Maple Leafs seasons
Toronto Maple Leafs season, 2011-12
Toronto